Stanley William Turrentine (April 5, 1934 – September 12, 2000) was an American jazz tenor saxophonist. He began his career playing R&B for Earl Bostic and later soul jazz recording for the Blue Note label from 1960, touched on jazz fusion during a stint on CTI in the 1970s. He was described by critic Steve Huey as "renowned for his distinctively thick, rippling tone [and] earthy grounding in the blues." In the 1960s Turrentine was married to organist Shirley Scott, with whom he frequently recorded, and he was the younger brother of trumpeter Tommy Turrentine, with whom he also recorded.

Biography
Turrentine was born in Pittsburgh's Hill District, United States, into a musical family. His father, Thomas Turrentine Sr., was a saxophonist with Al Cooper's Savoy Sultans, his mother played stride piano, and his older brother Tommy Turrentine was a trumpet player.

He began his prolific career with blues and rhythm and blues bands, and was at first greatly influenced by Illinois Jacquet. He first toured with Lowell Fulson's band in 1951, at 17, and in 1953 Earl Bostic asked him to join his band, replacing John Coltrane. He also played in groups led by the pianist and composer Tadd Dameron.

Turrentine received his only formal musical training during his military stint in the mid-1950s. In 1959, he left the military and went straight into the band of the drummer Max Roach.

He married the organist Shirley Scott in 1960 and the two frequently played and recorded together. In the 1960s, he started working with organist Jimmy Smith, and made many soul jazz recordings both with Smith and as a leader.

Scott and Turrentine divorced in 1971. Turrentine turned to jazz fusion and signed for Creed Taylor's CTI label. His first album for CTI, Sugar, recorded in 1970, proved one of his biggest successes and a seminal recording for the label, closely followed by Don't Mess with Mister T. (1971). He worked with Freddie Hubbard, Milt Jackson, George Benson, Bob James, Richard Tee, Idris Muhammad, Ron Carter, Grant Green and Eric Gale. He returned to soul jazz in the 1980s and into the 1990s.

Turrentine lived in Fort Washington, Maryland, from the early 1990s until his death.

He died of a stroke in New York City on September 12, 2000, aged 66, and was buried in Pittsburgh's Allegheny Cemetery.

Discography

As leader 

Blue Note Records
 1960: Look Out! (1960) – reissued as The Soul of Stanley Turrentine (Sunset, 1969)
 1960: Blue Hour with The Three Sounds (1960)
 1961: Comin' Your Way (1961)
 1961: Up at "Minton's", Volume 1 (1961) – live
 1961: Up at "Minton's", Volume 2 (1961) – live
 1961: Dearly Beloved with Shirley Scott (1961)
 1961: ZT's Blues (1985)
 1962: That's Where It's At with Les McCann (1962)
 1962: Jubilee Shout!!! (1986)[2LP]
 1963: Never Let Me Go with Shirley Scott (1963)
 1963: A Chip Off the Old Block with Shirley Scott (1963)
 1964: Hustlin' with Shirley Scott (1964)
 1964: In Memory Of (1980)
 1964: Mr. Natural (1980)
 1965: Joyride (1965)
 1966: Rough 'n' Tumble (1966)
 1966: Easy Walker (1968)
 1966: The Spoiler (1967)
 1967: A Bluish Bag (2007)
 1967: The Return of the Prodigal Son (2008)
 1968: The Look of Love (1968)
 1968: Common Touch with Shirley Scott (1968)
 1968: Always Something There (1968)
 1968–69: Ain't No Way (1980)
 1969: Another Story (1969)
 1979: New Time Shuffle (1967)
 1984: Straight Ahead with Jimmy Smith (1985)
 1986: Wonderland (Stanley Turrentine Plays the Music of Stevie Wonder)  (1987)
 1989?: La Place (1989)
 compilation: Stanley Turrentine (Blue Note Re-Issue Series, 1975)[2LP]

CTI Records
 1970: Sugar (1970)
 1971: Gilberto with Turrentine with Astrud Gilberto (1971)
 1971: Salt Song (1971)
 1971: The Sugar Man (1975)
 1972: Cherry with Milt Jackson (1972)
 1973: Freddie Hubbard/Stanley Turrentine in Concert Volume One (1974)
 1973: Freddie Hubbard/Stanley Turrentine In Concert Volume Two (1974)
 1973: Don't Mess with Mister T. (1973)

Fantasy Records
 1974: Pieces of Dreams (1974)
 1975: In the Pocket (1975)
 1975: Have You Ever Seen the Rain (1975)
 1976: Everybody Come On Out (1976)
 1976: The Man with the Sad Face (1976)
 1977: Nightwings (1977)
 1977: West Side Highway (1978)
 1978: What About You! (1978)
 1980?: Use the Stairs (1980)

Other labels
 1960: Stan "The Man" Turrentine (Time, 1963) – his first recorded album and re-released as Tiger Tail (Mainstream, 1965)
 1966: Let It Go with Shirley Scott (Impulse!, 1967)
 1970: Flipped – Flipped Out (Canyon) – also released as Another Fine Mess (DJM, 1975); reissued (Drive Archive, 1985)
 1977: Love's Finally Found Me with Gloria Lynne (Versatile)
 1979: Betcha (Elektra, 1979)
 1980?: Inflation (Elektra, 1980)
 1981: Tender Togetherness (Elektra, 1981)
 1982?: Home Again (Elektra, 1982)
 1992: More Than a Mood (MusicMasters, 1992)
 1993: If I Could (MusicMasters, 1993)
 1995: T Time (MusicMasters, 1995)
 1999?: Do You Have Any Sugar? (Concord Vista, 1999)

As sideman 

With Shirley Scott
 1961: Hip Soul (Prestige, 1961)
 1961: Hip Twist (Prestige, 1962)
 1963: The Soul Is Willing (Prestige, 1963)
 1963: Soul Shoutin' (Prestige, 1964)
 1964: Blue Flames (Prestige, 1964)
 1964: Everybody Loves a Lover (Impulse!, 1964)
 1964: Queen of the Organ (Impulse!, 1965) – live
 1968: Soul Song (Atlantic, 1969)
 1978: The Great Live Sessions  (ABC/Impulse!, 1964)[2LP]

With Kenny Burrell
 1963: Midnight Blue (Blue Note, 1963)
 1963–64: Freedom (Blue Note, 1980)

With Donald Byrd
 1964: Up with Donald Byrd (Verve, 1965)
 1964: I'm Tryin' to Get Home (Blue Note, 1965)

With Gene Harris
 1985: Gene Harris Trio Plus One (Concord, 1986)
 1995: Gene Harris & the Philip Morris All-Stars: Live (Concord, 1998)

With Abbey Lincoln
 1959: Abbey Is Blue (Riverside, 1959)
 1992: Devil's Got Your Tongue (Verve, 1992)

With Horace Parlan
 1960: Speakin' My Piece (Blue Note, 1960)
 1961: On the Spur of the Moment (Blue Note, 1961)

With Max Roach
 1959: Quiet as It's Kept (Mercury, 1960)
 1959: Moon Faced and Starry Eyed (Mercury, 1959)
 1960: Long as You're Living (Enja, 1984) – live
 1960: Parisian Sketches (Mercury, 1960)

With Jimmy Smith
 1960: Midnight Special (Blue Note, 1961)
 1960: Back at the Chicken Shack (Blue Note, 1963)
 1963: Prayer Meetin' (Blue Note, 1964)
 1968?: Stay Loose (Verve, 1968)
 1982: Off the Top (Elektra/Musician, 1982)
 1985?: Go For Watcha Know (Blue Note, 1985)
 1990: Fourmost (Milestone, 1991) – live
 1990: Fourmost Return (Milestone, 2001) – live

With others
 Georgie Fame, The Blues and Me (Go Jazz, 1996)
 Roy Hargrove, With the Tenors of Our Time (Verve, 1993)
 Freddie Hubbard, Life Flight (Blue Note, 1983)
 Duke Jordan, Flight to Jordan (Blue Note, 1960)
 Diana Krall, Only Trust Your Heart (GRP, 1994)
 Les McCann, Les McCann Ltd. in New York (Pacific Jazz, 1961) – live
 Jimmy McGriff, Electric Funk (Blue Note, 1969)
 David "Fathead" Newman, Fire! Live at the Village Vanguard (Atlantic, 1988) – live
 New York Funkies, Hip Hop Bop! with Reuben Wilson (Meldac [jp], 1995)
 Duke Pearson, The Right Touch (Blue Note, 1968) – rec. 1967
 Ike Quebec, Easy Living (Blue Note, 1962) – some material previously released as Congo Lament
 Dizzy Reece, Comin' On! (Blue Note, 1999) – rec. 1960
 Mongo Santamaria, Mongo's Way (Atlantic, 1970)
 Marlena Shaw, Elemental Soul (Concord, 1997)
 Horace Silver, Serenade to a Soul Sister (Blue Note, 1968)
 Art Taylor, A.T.'s Delight (Blue Note, 1960)
 Tommy Turrentine, Tommy Turrentine (Time, 1960)

References

External links

Stanley Turrentine at Hard Bop, accessed March 23, 2011
Stanley Turrentine biography at All About Jazz accessed January 6, 2010

1934 births
2000 deaths
African-American saxophonists
American jazz tenor saxophonists
American male saxophonists
Hard bop saxophonists
Jazz fusion saxophonists
Musicians from Pittsburgh
Schenley High School alumni
Soul-jazz saxophonists
Blue Note Records artists
Impulse! Records artists
Fantasy Records artists
Burials at Allegheny Cemetery
20th-century American saxophonists
Jazz musicians from Pennsylvania
20th-century American male musicians
American male jazz musicians
CTI Records artists
20th-century African-American musicians